Pichal peri or pichhal pairī ("reverse-footed"), also called churel/chuṛail/chudail is a monster or supernatural creature popularly appearing in ghost stories of South and Central Asia. Pichal peris usually appear female with long hair covering the face and feet pointing backward.

Background 
Pichal peris are said to roam the mountains of India and Pakistan. They are said to be found in the Himalayas, though it occasionally enters some Indian villages. In Pakistan, sightings are usually reported in the rural mountainous regions of the Khyber Pakhtunkhwa province, however sightings in the Punjab province are also occasionally reported. People who claim these reports are usually elders of rural villages who are known to hold superstitious beliefs, it is possible that people in Punjab have taken inspiration from their northern neighbours and made their own versions of the legend. The characteristics of the pichal peri vary depending on region.

In some versions, pichal peris appear in the woods at night and target lone men. Most stories will have the victim escaping as these are usually told by people who claim to be first hand witnesses. It is believed that pichal peris have two forms. In most stories they appear as beautiful women in order to lure men and get exposed only due to their backward feet. In some cases witnesses claim to see the female form transforming into a tall demonic creature.

See also
Roohi, Indian film incorporating the legend
 Churel
 Indian folklore
 Pakistani folklore
 Abarimon or antipode, people from classical mythology with their feet turned backwards and native to the Himalayas
 Ciguapa, Dominican mythological creatures in the form of dark-skinned women with very long hair and backward-facing feet
 Curupira

References 

Superstitions of Pakistan
Superstitions of India
Indian legendary creatures
Pakistani legendary creatures
Punjabi folklore
Mythological monsters
Supernatural legends